The Drac is a  long river in southeastern France. It is a left tributary of the river Isère. It is formed at the confluence of the Drac Noir and the Drac Blanc, which both rise in the southern part of the Massif des Écrins, high in the French Alps.  It flows through several reservoirs on its course, including the Lac de Monteynard-Avignonet. It flows into the Isère at Grenoble. Its major tributary is the Romanche.

The Drac flows through the following departments and towns:
 Hautes-Alpes: Saint-Bonnet-en-Champsaur
 Isère: Corps, Grenoble

The name Drac,  originally the Drau, is due to an attraction by the Occitan drac "imp", which is derived from the Latin dracō, meaning "Dragon". It is documented in the forms of Dracum (v. 1100), Dravus (1289) and the ribière dou Drau (1545). The word "Drac" means Dragon. In many legends the drac, in Occitan, is a genius of evil waters or a form of Satan that attracts children to drown. Frédéric Mistral wrote in Félibrige Treasury:

In December 1995, six children and their teacher were drowned in the river after the level of water rose due to the opening of the valves of a dam. They were there to see beavers. All of them died.

References

Rivers of France
Rivers of Hautes-Alpes
Rivers of Isère
Geography of Grenoble
Rivers of Provence-Alpes-Côte d'Azur
Rivers of Auvergne-Rhône-Alpes
Rivers of the Alps